"Off You" is a song by the Breeders. It was the first single released from their 2002 album Title TK. It was released in March 2002 on 4AD.

Track listing

Charts

Notes

References 
 

The Breeders songs
2002 singles
Songs written by Kim Deal
Song recordings produced by Steve Albini
4AD singles